The Chingford Stables are located in North East Valley, Dunedin, New Zealand. The stables are now used for both private and public functions, and listed as a Category I Historic Place.

History
The stables were built for P.C. Neill in the early 1870s. The stables housed Dunedin's business men's horses. The building is constructed of basalt. The stables no longer houses horses but is used as a venue for public and prestigious private events.

Location
The stables are located in Chingford Park which is named after a U.K. based property owned by the parks first owner, Doctor Buchanan.  Chingford Park hosts the Leith Valley Harrier Club, the Dunedin Archery Club, a children's playground, and a permanent orienteering course. This area was once Neill's property. Lindsay Creek, a small stream which runs the length of North East Valley, runs through the park.

References

External links
 Historic buildings of Dunedin

Buildings and structures in Dunedin
Heritage New Zealand Category 1 historic places in Otago
Stables
1870s architecture in New Zealand